The 2014–15 Goa Professional League (also known as the Airtel Goa Pro League for sponsorship reasons) will be the 17th season of top-tier football in the Indian state of Goa. It began on 24 August 2014. Sporting Goa are the defending champions.

Teams

Table

Fixtures and Results

Round 1

Round 2

Round 3

Round 4

Round 5

Round 6

Round 7

Round 8

Round 9

Championship League Fixtures

Relegation League Fixtures

Top scorers

References

External links 
Goa Pro League page at Goa Football Association website

Goa Professional League seasons
4